Tiago Vagaroso da Costa Monteiro (born 24 July 1976) is a Portuguese professional racing driver currently competing in the World Touring Car Cup, driving a Honda Civic TCR for Engstler Motorsport. He competed in Formula One between 2005 and 2006 for the Jordan Grand Prix, Midland and Spyker MF1 teams – all different iterations of the same team as it was bought by new owners during a two-year stint as part of the Formula One paddock. He is the only Portuguese driver to have scored a Formula One podium finish, during the controversial 2005 United States Grand Prix.

Monteiro started racing in the World Touring Car Championship in 2007 with Seat Sport, and remained with the Spanish manufacturer until 2012, when he switched to the new Honda team late in the season. He still remains with the Japanese manufacturer in 2019, having achieved his best championship finish of third in 2016, and also helped Honda to win the manufacturers' championship in 2013. He was leading the drivers' championship after 12 races in 2017, but injuries sustained in a crash in testing forced him to withdraw from the rest of the season. Monteiro is a 12-time World Touring Car race winner and achieved the eighth most wins in the WTCC, until it became the World Touring Car Cup in 2018.

Early career

Born in Porto, Monteiro was inspired by his father to begin racing, and drove in the 1997 French Porsche Carrera Cup. He took five wins and five pole positions to become B-class champion and rookie of the year. In 1998, he competed in the French F3 Championship, finishing 12th overall and taking the rookie of the year award. He continued in the championship in 1999, taking one win and three other podium positions to finish sixth overall. He also competed in the Le Mans 24 Hours race, finishing 17th overall and sixth in the GT2 class. In the International Renault Finals held at Estoril, Monteiro claimed the win after taking pole position and the fastest lap of the race.

In 2000, Monteiro again competed in French F3, this time finishing second in the championship after taking four wins throughout the season. He also competed in the single Formula 3 European Championship double-header race, finishing second overall with one win at Spa-Francorchamps. He also competed in a couple of one-off events, coming second in the Korea Super Prix and ninth at the famous Macau Grand Prix. In the Lamborghini Super Trophy, he achieved the fastest lap at Magny-Cours, and took pole position and the fastest lap at Laguna Seca Raceway. In 2001, Monteiro again finished second overall in the French F3 Championship after taking six pole positions, four wins and four podiums. Also competing in the French GT Championship, he managed four pole positions, two class wins and five podium finishes in the GTB class. A one-off entry in the Formula France series saw him win both races, and in the Andros Trophy, he did one fastest lap with a best finishing position of fourth.

In 2002, he stepped up to the F3000 Championship with the Super Nova team, taking five top-ten finishes on his way to 12th in the championship standings. He also completed the Renault F1 Driver Development Scheme, and had his first taste of a Formula One car, testing with the Renault team at Barcelona. In 2003, he joined Fittipaldi Dingman Racing for the Champ Car World Series, achieving a front row start in Mexico City and leading two races. He finished the year with 10 top-ten finishes, scoring 29 points to rank 15th overall in the championship. Monteiro was signed up as an official Minardi F1 test driver for the 2004 season, but also competed in the Nissan World Series with Carlin Motorsport. He was named Rookie of the Year after finishing second in the championship behind Heikki Kovalainen, and was ranked fifth in Autosport magazine's top ten drivers in the Formula One "breeding ground" championships.

Ironically, one of his surnames, "Vagaroso", means "slow" in Portuguese.

Formula One career

Jordan (2005)
After the Midland Group bought Jordan Grand Prix, Monteiro was announced as a full-time race driver alongside Indian Narain Karthikeyan for the 2005 season.

In the United States Grand Prix he achieved his only podium finish in controversial circumstances. Due to concerns over tyre safety, the Michelin-equipped teams pulled out of the race, not taking their place on the grid, and the race was contested only by the three Bridgestone-equipped teams. Monteiro finished third out of six drivers.

At the podium ceremony, at which none of the scheduled dignitaries were present, Ferrari drivers Michael Schumacher and Rubens Barrichello quietly accepted their awards, and quickly exited. Monteiro stayed behind to celebrate his first podium finish alone. The fans in attendance, while booing the majority of the ceremony, rewarded the Portuguese driver with a round of applause.

As of the 2005 United States Grand Prix, Monteiro is currently the most successful Portuguese driver in Formula One history. Pedro Lamy had previously held this record before with one point and sixth place achieved at the 1995 Australian Grand Prix with Minardi. Also of note, as of the Belgian Grand Prix (where he also scored another point), Monteiro had finished every race of the 2005 season, breaking the record for consecutive finishes for a rookie driver in Formula One, held by Jackie Stewart (1965 season) and Olivier Panis (1994 season), who finished their first six races. This record stood until the 2013 season, when British driver Max Chilton finished all 19 races.

Shortly before the 2005 Turkish Grand Prix, Monteiro suffered a toothache that was severe enough to prevent him taking part in the race. However, his team principal Colin Kolles, a qualified dentist, performed emergency root canal surgery and Monteiro was cleared to race.  He finished 15th following a collision with Juan Pablo Montoya, which resulted in the Colombian running wide on the penultimate lap and losing second place to Fernando Alonso, thus preventing Montoya's McLaren team scoring its first 1–2 finish since the 2000 Austrian Grand Prix.

Midland (2006)
In 2006 Midland re-signed Monteiro to partner Dutchman Christijan Albers. The two endured a largely uncompetitive season, with their M16 car failing to score a single point, and the pair were regularly outpaced during the year by Toro Rosso and occasionally Super Aguri. In the 18 races, Monteiro retired from six, with his best finish being at the wet-dry Hungarian Grand Prix where he finished ninth, just outside the points-scoring positions with Albers finishing behind in tenth.

On 21 December 2006, it was announced that Monteiro would not be driving for the newly renamed Spyker team in 2007. The highly rated German Adrian Sutil was instead signed on a multi-year contract. Monteiro had briefly held discussions about a drive for Toro Rosso, but these hopes were ended when the Faenza outfit confirmed Vitantonio Liuzzi as a driver at the launch of the STR2 car on 13 February 2007, followed by Scott Speed at a Bahrain testing session on 24 February, leaving Monteiro without a drive for the season.

World Touring Car Championship/Cup career

SEAT (2007–2012)

On 6 March 2007, it was announced that Monteiro would join the SEAT Sport team and would drive in the World Touring Car Championship (WTCC) with a SEAT León.

He was forced to wait until the second round of the 2007 season at Zandvoort to make his debut, as the contract was signed a few days before the season opener in Curitiba. However, he took three podium finishes and a pole position during a successful first season in which he was ranked 11th overall.

In 2008 driving the TDi version of the SEAT León, he took his first win at Puebla in Mexico, and later in the season he won the second race on home ground at Estoril in Portugal. These, other points finishes and a fastest lap during the season, saw him finish 12th overall in the final standings, which was won by SEAT team-mate Yvan Muller with the team also achieving the manufacturer's title.

He stayed with SEAT in 2009, and scored two podiums in Valencia and Brno en route to finishing 9th overall in the drivers standings, contributing to SEAT winning the manufacturers championship. On 13 January 2010, SEAT announced that it would be pulling out of the WTCC from at least the 2010 season. However, on 19 February 2010, it was announced that he would partner 2009 teammates Gabriele Tarquini and Jordi Gene along with Tom Coronel in the renamed SR-Sport team run by Sunred Engineering, which received significant funding from SEAT Sport. He achieved five podium finishes during the season, which included wins at his home event in Portimão and later in the year at Valencia. This was by far his most successful season in recent years as he finished in fifth place overall in the drivers' standings.

On 11 February 2011, it was confirmed that he would once again drive for Sunred Engineering in the forthcoming season, partnering rookies Aleksei Dudukalo and Pepe Oriola, as well as 2010 teammates Michel Nykjaer, Fredy Barth and 2009 champion Gabriele Tarquini.

Monteiro remained with the team for 2012 under the "Tuenti Racing Team" banner, where he was joined by 2011 teammate Pepe Oriola and rookie Andrea Barlesi.

Honda (2012–)

Monteiro joined the Honda Racing Team JAS team from their WTCC debut at the 2012 Race of Japan, racing the new Honda Civic. He scored the first podium finish for the Honda Civic in the WTCC at the 2012 Guia Race of Macau, finishing third in race one.

For the full 2013 season, Monteiro was joined by teammate Gabriele Tarquini. Monteiro went on to take his first win with Honda at Shanghai. Additionally, he scored five further podiums that season to help Honda win the manufacturers' world championship.

For 2014, Monteiro scored 5 podiums and earned 1 pole position on his way to 5th in the final championship standings. Monteiro stayed partnered with Honda and teammate Gabriele Tarquini for 2015. He would score a dominant win in Russia and a win in Honda's home race in Japan.

In 2016, Monteiro would take wins in Slovakia and Portugal. He took five further podiums to finish third in the championship, his best result yet.

In 2017, after taking two wins and five other podium finishes, he was leading the championship comfortably after 12 races, until he sustained serious injuries in an accident caused by a brake failure at Barcelona, Spain in September during testing. Because of the injuries sustained in the crash, he couldn't participate in the remaining races of the season.

In 2018, the series became the World Touring Car Cup (WTCR), and Monteiro was due to switch from JAS Motorsport to Boutsen Ginion Racing and drive the new FK8 Honda Civic Type R TCR, but he was not 100% recovered from his injuries to race in the first eight rounds. He would return to the sport at Suzuka, Japan in November 2018, for the penultimate round of the WTCR calendar, the same track where he made his debut for Honda in 2012 for the WTCC. He was greeted with a round of applause from fellow drivers as he was let out first to the track in Free Practice 1. Due to medical advice he didn't take part in the Season Finale at Macau.

He was set for a full season comeback in 2019 and switch teams from Boutsen Ginion Racing to KCMG, driving the Honda Civic Type R TCR. After a tough start to the season, he would take his first World Touring Car win since the accident in his home race in Portugal.

Team ownership
Monteiro became interested in team ownership during 2008, and held discussions with the BCN Competición team in the GP2 Series on the subject of a possible buy-out. On 27 November he announced that he had purchased the team and renamed it "Ocean Racing Technology". The team had a successful first year in 2009, including a win in the Belgian feature race with Portuguese driver Alvaro Parente. The team also competed in the GP2 Asia Series at the end of the year and the GP3 Series.  In the winter of 2012–13, the team withdrew from GP2 and GP3 due to a lack of funding.

Driver management
Monteiro manages the career of fellow Portuguese racing driver António Félix da Costa.

V8 Supercars

On 23 April 2010, it was announced that Monteiro would compete as a "guest" driver in the Gold Coast 600 round of the V8 Supercar Championship Series in Surfers Paradise from 22–24 October 2010. He shared a Holden VE Commodore with Tony D'Alberto, with the car being set up by the Tony D'Alberto Racing team under the Centaur Racing banner. The pair recorded a DNF and a 17th-place finish in their two races.

Personal life

On 16 August 2008, Monteiro married Portuguese model Diana Pereira. The couple have a daughter, Mel (born in February 2008) and a son, Noah (born in November 2009).

Racing record

Career summary

* Season still in progress.

24 Hours of Le Mans results

Complete International Formula 3000 results
(key) (Races in bold indicate pole position) (Races in italics indicate fastest lap)

Complete CART results
(key)

Complete Formula One results
(key)

Complete World Touring Car Championship results
(key) (Races in bold indicate pole position) (Races in italics indicate fastest lap)

† Driver did not finish the race, but was classified as he completed over 90% of the race distance.

Complete World Touring Car Cup results
(key) (Races in bold indicate pole position) (Races in italics indicate fastest lap)

† Driver did not finish the race, but was classified as he completed over 90% of the race distance.

24 Hours of Nürburgring results

References

External links

 Official website
 Tiago Monteiro profile and statistics
 Tiago Monteiro statistics 1998 and forward
 Tiago Monteiro WTCC profile

1976 births
Living people
Portuguese people of Brazilian descent
Portuguese racing drivers
Portuguese Formula One drivers
Jordan Formula One drivers
Midland Formula One drivers
World Touring Car Championship drivers
Supercars Championship drivers
Champ Car drivers
French Formula Three Championship drivers
24 Hours of Le Mans drivers
Sportspeople from Porto
International Formula 3000 drivers
European Le Mans Series drivers
Sports agents
International GT Open drivers
World Touring Car Cup drivers
Carlin racing drivers
ART Grand Prix drivers
FIA World Endurance Championship drivers
KCMG drivers
Kolles Racing drivers
Teo Martín Motorsport drivers
British Formula Three Championship drivers
Signature Team drivers
Oreca drivers
Larbre Compétition drivers
Super Nova Racing drivers
OAK Racing drivers
Nürburgring 24 Hours drivers
Michelin Pilot Challenge drivers
Cupra Racing drivers
Boutsen Ginion Racing drivers
Engstler Motorsport drivers